Mount Washington is a neighborhood in Pittsburgh, Pennsylvania's south city area. It has a Zip Code of 15211 and has representation on Pittsburgh City Council by both the council members for District 3 (Central South Neighborhoods) and District 2 (West Neighborhoods).

It is known for its steep hill overlooking the Pittsburgh skyline, which was rated the most beautiful vista in America by USA Weekend (and the best urban vista); its funiculars, the Duquesne and Monongahela Inclines, which are the oldest continuous inclines in the world; and for the row of upscale restaurants paralleling the crest of Mount Washington, the hill upon which  the community sits.

Chatham Village
One of the most famous examples of the early-twentieth century Garden City Movement communities is on Mount Washington.  Chatham Village is a compact neighborhood of townhomes and gardens on the far south end of Mount Washington.

Services
The area is served by the Pittsburgh Bureau of Fire house number 27, equipped with a new  Pierce Quint engine.

Surrounding Pittsburgh neighborhoods
Mount Washington has six Pittsburgh neighborhood borders, including the South Shore at the bottom of the hillside to the north, Allentown to the east, Beltzhoover to the south, Bon Air to the southeast, Beechview to the west and southwest, and Duquesne Heights to the west and northwest.

See also
 List of Pittsburgh neighborhoods

References

External links

The MWCDC - Mount Washington Community Development Corporation
Interactive Pittsburgh neighborhoods map
15211.org - A community blog about Mount Washington

Neighborhoods in Pittsburgh
Economy of Pittsburgh